Rachel Jane Pullar (born 3 June 1977) is a New Zealand former cricketer who played primarily as a right-arm medium bowler. She appeared in 51 One Day Internationals for New Zealand between 1997 and 2005, and she twice claimed five-wickets in an innings. She played domestic cricket for Central Districts and Otago.

References

External links

1977 births
Living people
Sportspeople from Balclutha, New Zealand
New Zealand women cricketers
New Zealand women One Day International cricketers
Central Districts Hinds cricketers
Otago Sparks cricketers